Nicholas Jon Murphy (born October 22, 1979) was an American football punter with 4 years spent between the National Football League and NFL Europa. Two of these three years were spent playing in Europe.

Life and career
Murphy was born in Saint Louis, Missouri. A three-year letterman at Arizona State, Murphy was a Ray Guy Award semi-finalist as the nation’s top punter and was named honorable mention and second-team All-Pac-10.  He was also named to the Academic All-Pac 10 Team twice.

Murphy was an undrafted rookie free agent with the Minnesota Vikings in April 2002. He was released during Training Camp. Following this he played with NFL Europa's Barcelona Dragons.  He spent the 2003 and 2004 seasons honing his skills in NFL Europa, playing with Barcelona and the Scottish Claymores, and was voted to the All NFL Europe Team in both seasons.

In 2004, Murphy enjoyed a three-game stint with Baltimore, subbing for an injured Dave Zastudil.  He played in five regular season NFL games with the Ravens and Chiefs in 2004, punting 22 times for 966 yards (43.9 gross, 37.3 net) with seven inside the 20 and three touchbacks.  In 2005, he appeared in one game for the Philadelphia Eagles in their victory over Brett Favre and the Green Bay Packers.

Career stats

Personal life
Murphy enjoys traveling, working out and coaching high school and collegiate kickers and punters as a way to stay involved in football and to share his expertise with young players. Nick resides in Scottsdale, AZ with his wife and five children.

Professional
Nick Murphy worked as an athlete for 7 years. He earned his undergraduate degree from Arizona State University while playing for their team, the Sun Devils. He went on to play in the NFL and NFL Europe leagues. In 2006, Murphy began graduate school and co-founded WorkBlast.com, the first national video resume SaaS platform, which raised more than $500k in seed funding.

After a successful sales career in the recruitment advertising space for market leaders CareerBuilder, Monster.com and Indeed, Murphy founded Mid-America Careers, a job site that covers the Midwestern United States serving local employers.

He also launched Job Spot, Inc, a consulting firm for Talent Acquisition leaders providing thought leadership and consulting services, helping them prioritize and negotiate their recruitment advertising spend.

He has been featured in HR.com’s HR Genius series. Currently, he is serving on several advisory boards and is the author of the book Ahead of the Curve – Navigating 21st Century Recruitment Challenges for Ultimate Talent Acquisition Success, encouraging leaders to embrace opportunities for change.

Education
Nick Murphy earned his undergraduate degree from Arizona State University in Broadcast Management (BA) in 2002, and an M.B.A. the WP Carey School of Business at Arizona State in 2010.

References

External links
Sports Illustrated Player Page
Kansas City Chiefs Player Page
(https://www.linkedin.com/in/nickmurphy/ LinkedIn Page)

1979 births
Living people
Players of American football from St. Louis
American football punters
Arizona State Sun Devils football players
Barcelona Dragons players
Scottish Claymores players
Baltimore Ravens players
Kansas City Chiefs players
Philadelphia Eagles players